Taylor Heise (born March 17, 2000) is an American women's ice hockey forward for Minnesota and member of the United States women's national ice hockey team. She won the Patty Kazmaier Award in 2022.

Early life
Heise attended Red Wing High School where she was a four-time USA Today American Family Insurance All-USA honoree. As a senior in 2018, she recorded 58 goals and 25 assists in 24 games. Following an outstanding season, she named the 2018 USA Today High School Sports All-USA Girls Hockey Player of the Year and won the Minnesota Ms. Hockey Award.

Playing career
Heise began her collegiate career for the Minnesota Golden Gophers during the 2018–19 season. During her freshman year she recorded 13 goals and 22 assists in 39 games. She led the team with 147 shots on goal, and second on the team with four multi-goal games. She also ranked tied for second in the WCHA and ninth in the nation with a team-best five game-winning goals. She led WCHA rookies with 22 assists, and ranked third among WCHA rookies and sixth among NCAA rookies with 0.90 points per game. Following the season she was named to the WCHA All-Rookie team.

During the 2019–20 season in her sophomore year, she recorded 18 goals and 25 assists in 36 games. She ranked third on the team with a career-high 43 points, ranked second on the team with 25 assists, and ranked second on the team and sixth in the WCHA with 168 shots on goal. Following the season she was named to the All-WCHA Third Team. During the 2020–21 season in her junior year, she recorded seven goals and nine assists in a season that was shortened due to the COVID-19 pandemic. She ranked second on the team with 74 shots on goal, and third on the team with 16 points.

During the 2021–22 season in her senior year, she led the NCAA in scoring with 66 points on 29 goals and 37 assists in 39 games. She recorded five shorthanded goals, the most in the nation, and third most in a single season in program history. She became the first player in program history to surpass 60 points in a season since Dani Cameranesi. She was named the WCHA Forward of the Month and the HCA National Player of the Month for the month of November. She recorded eight goals and eight assists. She recorded a multi-point game in five of six contests in the month. She scored her second career hat trick on November 12, 2021, in a game against RIT. She was named the WCHA Forward of the Month and HCA Co-National Player of the Month for the month of March. She recorded eight goals and 10 assists in eight games during the month, including five multi-point and two multi-goal games. She became the first Gopher to win the award three times in a single season since its inception in 2016–17. Following an outstanding season, she was named first-team All-WCHA, WCHA Offensive Player of the Year and WCHA Player of the Year. She was also named CCM/AHCA First-Team All-American and won the Patty Kazmaier Award. She led the NCAA in both total points (66) and points per game (1.69), and ranked second in goals (29) and sixth in assists (37).

During the 2022–23 season in her graduate student year, she led the NCAA in goals with 29, and ranked second in points with 65 in 37 games. During the regular season she led the conference in scoring with 19 goals and 51 points in 28 games. She was named HCA National Player of the Month in December and WCHA Forward of the Month in February. Following an outstanding season, she was named first-team All-WCHA and WCHA Forward of the Year for the second consecutive year. She was also named CCM/AHCA First-Team All-American.

International play
Heise represented the United States at the 2016 IIHF World Women's U18 Championship, where she recorded two goals and one assist in five games and won a gold medal. She represented the United States at the 2017 IIHF World Women's U18 Championship, where she recorded one assist in five games and won a gold medal. She was named captain for the United States at the 2018 IIHF World Women's U18 Championship. She recorded four goals and four assists in five games and won a gold medal. Following the tournament, she was named the Best Forward and Tournament MVP.

On August 14, 2022, she was named to the roster for the United States at the 2022 IIHF Women's World Championship. She led the tournament in scoring with seven goals and 11 assists in seven games to help team USA win a silver medal. She was subsequently named the Best Forward and Tournament MVP.

Career statistics

Regular season and playoffs

International

Awards and honors

References

External links

2000 births
Living people
American women's ice hockey forwards
Ice hockey people from Minnesota
Minnesota Golden Gophers women's ice hockey players
Patty Kazmaier Award winners
People from Lake City, Minnesota
21st-century American women